The Treaties of Reichenbach were agreements signed in Reichenbach (present-day Dzierżoniów).

Treaty of Reichenbach (1790)
Treaties of Reichenbach (1813)